Allison Diane Curtin (born March 31, 1980) is a former basketball player who was drafted with the twelfth pick in the 2003 WNBA Draft.

Illinois statistics 

Source

Personal life
Curtin has four brothers and four sisters. In high school she also participated in track and cross country. In 1998 she was named Illinois Ms. Basketball.

References

External links
WNBA.com: Allison Curtin Printable Stats

1980 births
Living people
American women's basketball players
Basketball players from Illinois
Guards (basketball)
Illinois Fighting Illini women's basketball players
People from Taylorville, Illinois
Tulsa Golden Hurricane women's basketball players
21st-century American women